La Rivoluzione Liberale (Italian: Liberal Revolution) was an Italian anti-Fascist liberal magazine which was published on a weekly basis in Turin between 1922 and 1925. The magazine is mostly known for its founder, Piero Gobetti.

History and profile
La Rivoluzione Liberale was established in Turin by Piero Gobetti in 1922, and the first issue appeared on 12 February that year. Gobetti also edited the magazine which was published weekly by Einaudi. Its publisher was a small company which was owned by Gobetti.

In the first issue the magazine declared itself as a forum for discussion of the problems concerning the Italian political system and civic and cultural life of the Kingdom. It attempted to inform its readers about the origins of these problems and about Gobetti's theories of government and his views on a new political synthesis. Gobetti employed the magazine as a vehicle to present a liberal revolution which he argued that the Kingdom had not experienced. One of the contributors was Ada Gobetti, wife of Piero. Due to its opposition to the Fascist rule and the policies of the Kingdom the magazine was subject to frequent bans and was permanently closed in November 1925.

Gobetti continued his opposition to Fascist rule in another magazine, Il Baretti, which had been also founded by him.

References

External links

1922 establishments in Italy
1925 disestablishments in Italy
Anti-fascism in Italy
Banned magazines
Censorship in Italy
Defunct political magazines published in Italy
Italian-language magazines
Liberalism in Italy
Magazines established in 1922
Magazines disestablished in 1925
Magazines published in Turin